Fluvidona petterdi is a species of minute freshwater snail with an operculum, an aquatic gastropod mollusk or micromollusk in the family Hydrobiidae. This species is endemic to Australia.

See also 
 List of non-marine molluscs of Australia

References

External links

Fluvidona
Hydrobiidae
Gastropods of Australia
Endemic fauna of Australia
Critically endangered fauna of Australia
Gastropods described in 1882
Taxonomy articles created by Polbot